Sceptobiini is a tribe of rove beetles in the family Staphylinidae. There are at least two genera and about five described species in Sceptobiini.

Genera
These two genera belong to the tribe Sceptobiini:
 Dinardilla Wasmann, 1901
 Sceptobius Sharp, 1883

References

Further reading

 
 
 
 
 
 

Aleocharinae
Articles created by Qbugbot